Özer Ateşçi (born 16 June 1942) is a Turkish alpine skier. He competed in three events at the 1968 Winter Olympics.

References

1942 births
Living people
Turkish male alpine skiers
Olympic alpine skiers of Turkey
Alpine skiers at the 1968 Winter Olympics
Sportspeople from Erzurum
20th-century Turkish people